A spin model is a mathematical model used in physics primarily to explain magnetism. Spin models may either be classical or quantum mechanical in nature. Spin models have been studied in quantum field theory as examples of integrable models. Spin models are also used in quantum information theory and computability theory in theoretical computer science. The theory of spin models is a far reaching and unifying topic that cuts across many fields.

Introduction
In ordinary materials, the magnetic dipole moments of individual atoms produce magnetic fields that cancel one another, because each dipole points in a random direction. Ferromagnetic materials below their Curie temperature, however, exhibit magnetic domains in which the atomic dipole moments are locally aligned, producing a macroscopic, non-zero magnetic field from the domain. These are the ordinary "magnets" with which we are all familiar. 

The study of the behavior of such "spin models" is a thriving area of research in condensed matter physics. For instance, the Ising model describes spins (dipoles) that have only two possible states, up and down, whereas in the Heisenberg model the spin vector is allowed to point in any direction. In certain magnets, the magnetic dipoles are only free to rotate in a 2D plane, a system which can be adequately described by the so-called xy-model. 

The lack of a unified theory of magnetism forces scientist to model magnetic systems theoretically with one, or a combination of these spin models in order to understand the intricate behavior of atomic magnetic interactions . Numerical implementation of these models has led to several interesting results, such as quantitative research in the theory of phase transitions.

Quantum
A quantum spin model is a quantum Hamiltonian model that describes a system which consists of spins either interacting or not and are an active area of research in the fields of strongly correlated electron systems, quantum information theory, and quantum computing. The physical observables in these quantum models are actually operators in a Hilbert space acting on state vectors as opposed to the physical observables in the corresponding classical spin models - like the Ising model - which are commutative variables.

See also

 ANNNI model
 Bethe ansatz
 Ising model
 Classical Heisenberg model
 Quantum Heisenberg model
 Hubbard model
 J1 J2 model
 Kuramoto model
 Magnetism
 Majumdar–Ghosh model
 Potts model
 t-J model
 Quantum rotor model
 Spin
 Spin stiffness
 Spin waves
 XY model
 Yang–Baxter equation
 Z N model

References

Bibliography

 R.J. Baxter, Exactly solved models in statistical mechanics, London, Academic Press, 1982

External links
Introduction to classical and Ising Spin Models
Quantum Field Theory of Many-Body Systems 
Institute of Quantum Information Caltech

Magnetism
Statistical mechanics